A keelboat is a riverine cargo-capable working boat, or a small- to mid-sized recreational sailing yacht.  The boats in the first category have shallow structural keels, and are nearly flat-bottomed and often used leeboards if forced in open water, while modern recreational keelboats have prominent fixed fin keels, and considerable draft.  The two terms may draw from cognate words with different final meaning.

A keel boat, keelboat, or keel-boat is a type of usually long, narrow cigar-shaped riverboat, or unsheltered water barge which is sometimes also called a poleboat—that is built about a slight keel and is designed as a boat built for the navigation of rivers, shallow lakes, and sometimes canals that were commonly used in America including use in great numbers by settlers making their way west in the century-plus of wide-open western American frontiers. They were also used extensively for transporting cargo to market, and for exploration and trading expeditions, for water transport was then most effective means to move bulky or heavy cargo.

Keelboats were similar to riverboats, but like other barges were unpowered and were typically propelled and steered with oars or setting poles—usually the latter. Keelboats have been used for exploration, such as during the Lewis and Clark Expedition, but were primarily used to transport cargo or settlers in the early 19th century. The process of moving a keelboat upriver was extremely difficult, though current dependent. They usually had a cabin in the middle or at the rear, but were sometimes constructed with an open deck. Mike Fink is probably the most noted keelboater in history.

Historical account of two keelboats published in the original Courier Journal of Lafayette, Indiana, in 1833:

In Great Britain and Ireland
The term keel was associated in Great Britain with three particular working boat types. The Norfolk Keel ancestor of the Norfolk Wherry, the Humber Keel and the Tyne Keel and their Keelmen. In Ireland the Howth 17 was designed by Sir Walter Boyd in 1897, and is the oldest one-design racing  keelboat in the world.

Modern keelboats

A keelboat is technically any sailboat with a keel—as opposed to a centerboard or daggerboard. In New Zealand the term keeler is frequently used as a generic alternative - meaning any sailboat with a keel, regardless of size.

World Sailing (Former ISAF, Former IYRU) usage differentiates keelboats (including the 12-meter class) from generally larger yachts, despite overlap in the sizes of boats in the two classes.  The Olympic Games used keelboat to describe keeled boats with up to a three-man crew, as opposed to larger-crewed boats such as the 12-metre class.

In some countries yachts can also be differentiated from keelboats with the addition of a toilet or "head" as the term "keelboat" is in some places understood to mean a sailboat with a keel that is designed purely for recreational/racing purposes, while the term "yacht" describes a sailboat designed for overnight transport.

See also
 'Classic' keelboat classes (List of keelboat classes designed before 1970)
 Ferryboat
 Flatboat
 List of sailing boat types
 Keelmen
 Norfolk Wherry
 Riverboat
 Mike Fink Keel Boats
Lewis and Clark's Keelboat

References

External links
 Classic Boat guide to X One Design Keelboat
 Solent XOD Forum on CrewInCowes.co.uk website
 Website with Keelboat history and details
 The Keelboat Age on Western Waters, by Leland D. Baldwin, University of Pittsburgh Press, 1941. (provides the authority for the previous linked website)
 Steambots Times, Keelboats

 
Mississippi River
Ohio River
American folklore
Riverboats
American frontier
Fur trade
Exploration ships